Jack Maddocks (born 5 February 1997) is an Australian professional rugby union player for the New South Wales Waratahs in Super Rugby. His preferred position is fullback, but he can also play on the wing.

Career
Maddocks made his debut for the Rebels against the Blues as a starter in a 56-18 defeat for the Rebels, overcoming glandular fever to start the game.

Maddocks was selected as one of two development players within the Australian squad for the 2017 Wallabies tour.

Super Rugby statistics

References

External links
 

1997 births
Australia international rugby union players
Australian rugby union players
Rugby union fullbacks
Melbourne Rebels players
Melbourne Rising players
Living people
Rugby union wings
New South Wales Waratahs players
Australian rugby sevens players
Section Paloise players
Australian expatriate rugby union players
Expatriate rugby union players in France
Rugby union players from Sydney